The Man from Home can refer to:

 The Man from Home (1914 film), a film directed by Cecil B. DeMille
 The Man from Home (1922 film), a film directed by George Fitzmaurice